Alī ibn Khalaf was an Andalusian astronomer who belonged to the scientific circle of Ṣāʿid al- Andalusī.

He devised, with help from al-Zarqali, the universal astrolabe. Both Khalaf and al-Zarqali's design were included in the Libros del Saber (1227) of Alfonso X of Castile.

References

11th-century astronomers
11th-century people from al-Andalus
Astronomers from al-Andalus
Scientific instrument makers from al-Andalus
Inventors of the medieval Islamic world